Hannacroix is a hamlet in the town of New Baltimore, in Greene County, New York, United States. Hannacroix has a post office with ZIP code 12087.

References

Hamlets in Greene County, New York
Hamlets in New York (state)